Michelle Abueng (born 6 May 2001) is a Motswana footballer who plays as a forward for Zambian club Yasa FC and the Botswana women's national team.

She caught the attention of Zambian club Yasa Queens while playing against Zambia in the 2018 African U-17 Women's World Cup Qualifying Tournament, but they were not able to sign her until 2019 since she was still a minor at the time.

She scored five goals in a game against Namibia at the 2020 African U-20 Women's World Cup Qualifying Tournament.

She made her senior international debut at the 2019 COSAFA Women's Championship on 1 August 2019, scoring the only goal in a win over Namibia.

References

External links

2001 births
Living people
People from Central District (Botswana)
Botswana women's footballers
Women's association football forwards
Botswana women's international footballers
Botswana expatriate women's footballers
Botswana expatriate sportspeople in Zambia
Expatriate women's footballers in Zambia